Parisel Mpemba (born 1 December 1978) is a team handball player from the Democratic Republic of the Congo. She plays for the club St. Maure, and on the DR Congo national team. She represented DR Congo at the 2013 World Women's Handball Championship in Serbia, where DR Congo placed 20th.

References

1978 births
Living people
Democratic Republic of the Congo female handball players
Democratic Republic of the Congo expatriates in France